Büren Castle is a castle in the municipality of Büren an der Aare in the canton of Bern in Switzerland.  It is a Swiss heritage site of national significance.

History
The castle was built in 1621-24 as the residence of the Bernese Landvogt over the area.  It was built on the site of four farm houses.  Between 1624 and the 1798 French invasion a total of 77 Landvogts lived in the castle.  Some of the bullet scars from the  troops that invaded in 1798 are still visible on the castle walls.  Today the castle is home to the municipal administration and government offices.  In 2003 the 17th century murals and other art were restored to their original appearance.

See also
 List of castles in Switzerland

References

External links
 

Cultural property of national significance in the canton of Bern
Castles in the Canton of Bern